Perro Amor (Dog Love) is a Spanish-language telenovela produced by the United States-based television network Telemundo that originally ran in the United States from January to July 2010. This is a Colombian remake of the 1998 Cenpro Televisión daily telenovela Perro Amor, written by Natalia Ospina and Andrés Salgado. As with most of its other telenovelas, Telemundo broadcast English subtitles as closed captions on CC3.

Plot
The action takes place in Miami, Florida. Perro amor tells the story of two lovers: Antonio "el perro (Dog)" Brando (Carlos Ponce) and Camila Brando (Maritza Rodríguez), who are also cousins. Ever since their teens, they have been playing at love. Now they are two lovers trying to live a life full of adventure, passion, conquests and bets. Anything goes: making love in a window in the bathroom of their office, or on the day of Antonio's wedding. All under one condition: no love between them, nor for anyone else. Love is a game, and the one who falls in love loses.

Antonio is all set to marry Daniela (Maritza Bustamante), the daughter of his father's business partner. But on their wedding day Camila makes him one of her famous bets: he wouldn't dare leave the bride at the altar. Antonio accepts the bet and goes through with it, refusing to say "I do" regardless of the likely consequences: Daniela's dad is the largest investor in the Brando family's construction company. Antonio's offensive behavior jeopardizes an important development project in which the Brando family's fortune is tied up, leaving the Brandos on the brink of bankruptcy. Also, on the day of the wedding, while preparing for the wedding (and after making love to Camila), through the window he spots Sofia (Ana Lucía Domínguez), whose mother is the caterer for the wedding and Sofia her assistant.

Parallel to this, the cash-pressed Brando family business deceives and defrauds Dagoberto (Gerardo Riveron), who represents a group of poor homeowners, who are said to benefit from the project that Daniela's father is investing in, but the Brandos, (notably Camila and her husband Gonzalo (Rodrigo de la Rosa) as the other members of the family are not familiar with the real master plan, as Camila is the head of the project), take possession of the houses in the neighborhood and then refuse to pay for them. This drives Dagoberto to take his own life rather than face the neighbors who trusted him. His son, Rocky (Khotan Fernández) swears revenge. Rocky is an honest young man who dreams of being a musician, a promising pop singer who is in love with Sofia, offering her a sincere love without lies or bets. He's trying everything he could do to take revenge on the Brandos.

But Antonio and Camila have gone too far, regardless of Sofia. The economic future of the construction company is at stake, along with a whole neighborhood, a family and the happiness of Rocky. But something will change: Antonio's father, Pedro (Victor Camara), puts Antonio out on the street for being irresponsible. Antonio decides to marry Sofia and show his father that he has matured, but Sofia already knows what he is, and does not want to have anything to do with him. Camila, meanwhile, tries to recover Antonio by making life impossible for both him and Sofia, without acknowledging she is in love with him.

Meanwhile, behind the scenes it is discovered by some, that Camila is NOT a Brando after all, and that her mother and "father" were just friends, as her "father" was in reality gay. Her biological father is a man named Luigi Dorado, who was a drifter who mostly would take advantage of women, and be a "playboy" of sorts. He was hidden for 30 years; despite apparently knowing the truth, he blackmails her with money demands in return of his silence. At the same time, Luigi begins to have a relationship with Cecilia (Zully Montero), Antonio's grandmother, and matriarch of the Brando family, but this relationship is mostly a ploy to scare Camila, to avoid telling Cecilia the truth of Camila's paternity. (Although, later in the novel, it is revealed that Cecilia knew all along that her son wasn't Camila's father). Cecilia, suspecting that Luigi's intentions weren't genuine, asks Rosario (Sofia's mother and daughter of Cecilia's best friend Ligia) to act as a decoy, to try to find out what Luigi is up to. But, the plan gets exposed by Luigi, and he attempts to rape her, before police arrive. Luigi is sentenced to jail for the attempted rape, and Camilla, tired of Luigi's blackmails, decides to have him killed.  As a result, he was attacked by Alejandro Vallejo, a fellow prisoner, who was contracted by Jairo Chaparro in exchange for his freedom. In the end, Luigi wasn't killed, though injured, and Chaparro never intended to free Vallejo, and used him for his "dirty work". Later on, Camilla unsuccessful with the plot to kill Luigi, pays for Luigi's bail, in hopes that he forgives and forgets about everything that transpired.

At the same time Antrried to Sofia, but Camilia tries everything she could to separate them but always fail. Sofia would get angry at Antonio but in the end she ends up forgiving him. Rocky on the other hand poisons Sofia's mind about Antonio, just the same as Camila. It's pretty clear that Camila, who is in love with Antonio and Rocky in love with Sofia. Both Camila and Rocky are the reasons why Antonia and Sofia always.

Antonio will always be a dog who doesn't appreciate anything, he is addicted to sex and can't take "no" for sex. Sofia finds out that she's pregnant and is excited about the news then decides to go to the club to tell her husband "Antonio" but finds him with a girl making love. This makes her angry to the extended part that she can't take it anymore.

Around the same time, Antonio realizes he truly is in love with Sofia, and he no longer wants to have a relationship with Camilla, or any relationship with anyone else so he decides to go to counseling for his sex addiction.
Six months pass, Sofia is ready to deliver her child (with Antonio), and Antonio returns from rehab and is seemingly cured from his addiction and is ready to be the model father and husband that Sofia dreamed he would be. But,  Sofia has grown tired of Antonio's past antics and is determined to divorce him. But Nany comes back in town and discovers she has AIDS, She decides to tell Antonio about her status, and this was on the same day that Sofia had to deliver her child. Antonio couldn't make it to the hospital as he was worried about his status. This makes Sofia more angry because she thought that Antonio has changed to the best but this makes her believe that Antonio has not yet change and she delivers with his absence.

Camilia finds out about Nany's status and thinks that Antonio is HIV positive. She tells Sofia that she and her son are both positive and everyone who was involved with Antonio and Camilia are now worried that they could be infected, causing a big problem as Antonio was one of her many partners. After a slight scare, and after several blood tests, it's discovered that everyone (Antonio, Gonzalo, Daniela, and Tamayo) is negative. (Camilla claims to be positive but that was just a plot to get Gonzalo closer to her, after he seemed to falling for Daniela). Camila and Gonzalo realize that their scheming is catching up to them, so as a result they plan one final big heist, by selling multiple properties twice, and defrauding every 2nd buyer (being that the first buyer would be the legitimate buyer, and everyone after that, invalid) and keeping the money. But, the plot is exposed, as a result Gonzalo winds up in jail and Camila is kept free, after she put the blame of the fraud all on him, when it reality it was more her idea, and he was just an accomplice. While Gonzalo is in jail, Camila, now working alone, enlists the help of Chaparro once again. Chaparro decides they need to put all the fraud money that Camila and Gonzalo embezzled and put it into a bank account in the Bahamas, under a fake name, the fake name being "Alejandro Vallejo", the same prisoner who he promised earlier to release from jail, and didn't. A problem arises, when the prisoner finds this information out, and blackmails Chaparro, as a result Chaparro calls for Vallejo's death, making it look like a suicide. Gonzalo who had just been in the room with Vallejo, realizes that it wasn't a suicide after all, and that he was ordered to be killed.

At the same time, Luigi, who has since struck a legitimate relationship with Clemencia (Antonio's mother and Pedro's estranged wife) realizes that Camila may be the real criminal of everything that's going on. The day Vallejo is murdered, Luigi visits the prison and talks to Vallejo, and Vallejo tells him everything he knows, and that if he's killed, it's Chaparro's doing (Vallejo himself was asked to kill Luigi earlier in the telenovela; he was fully aware of what Chaparro was capable of) and wrote on a piece of paper the proof that Chaparro is behind the money laundering scheme.

Also, in the past few months, Rocky Paris lets his fame go to his head, and he becomes arrogant to everyone he's dealt with in his life, only wanting two things: (1) revenge on the Brandos for his father's suicide (which in reality was Camila and Jairo Chaparro's doing) and (2) Sofia. Because, of this tired of Rocky's attitude, Benny quits the band.

Antonio, realizing Sofia doesn't want to be with him, and refusing to go back to Sofia, meets and falls in love with a veterinarian called Miranda (Angélica Celaya). Sofia also gives in to Rocky's advances and falls in love then later agrees to marry him. Also around this time, Cecilia is suffering from heart disease and is in need for a transplant, which results in Sofia and Pedro to run the company trying to undo the bad deeds of Camila and Gonzalo. Gonzalo later turning face by exposing Camila and Jairo's plan. When Camila gets word of the developments, she decides she needs to kill Cecilia in the hospital, and nearly succeeds, but is saved by both Antonio and Miranda, only to now need the heart transplant more urgent.

Luigi, knowing all the truths, is ready to kill Jairo for all the misdeeds he committed, and it culminates into a shootout, where Luigi is killed. Luigi turns out to be an organ donor and his heart is given to Cecilia. Cecilia fully recovers and is now ready for a new plan to save her company and resolve the issues of the poor homeowners.

Camila and Jairo team up again to kidnap Sofia's baby and escape from the country. When  the police are about to trap her, Camila commits suicide by shooting herself on a boat. Sofia turns down Rocky when they were about to get married because she was in love with Antonio. Antonio proposes Marinda because he thinks that Sofia is now a married to Rocky and that it is hopeless to be running around Sofia. When he finds out that Sofia is not married things turns out around because he's madly in love with Sofia and this only mean one thing. The whole truth was finally out and nothing or no one was on the way of Sofia and Antonio to be together they therefore work on their relationship and then Antonio and Sofia get married. And live happy as one family and good parents to their son.

Main cast

Special cast

International Broadcasters of Perro Amor

United States broadcast 
 Release dates, episode name and length, and U.S. viewers based on Telemundo's broadcast.

References

External links
 Lanzamiento de Perro Amor
 Seriesnow

2010 telenovelas
2010 American television series debuts
2010 American television series endings
American television series based on telenovelas
Telemundo telenovelas
Spanish-language American telenovelas
Television shows set in Miami
Television shows filmed in Miami
American television series based on Colombian television series